Counting for Thunder is a 2017 American romantic comedy-drama film written by, directed by and starring Phillip Irwin Cooper.

Cast
Phillip Irwin Cooper
Mariette Hartley
John Heard
Peter Stebbings as Joe

Release
The film was released on DVD and VOD on May 2, 2017.

Reception
Leigh Monson of Substream Magazine awarded the film two stars out of five.

References

External links
 
 

American romantic comedy-drama films
2017 romantic comedy-drama films
2017 comedy films
2010s English-language films
2010s American films